Dilshad Khan is a Hindustani classical singer.

Early life and background
Khan was born Arabinda Dasgupta in Kolkata. Dilshad is the younger brother of eminent sarod maestro Buddhadev Das Gupta. He attended St. Xavier's Collegiate School, Kolkata, where future music composer R. D. Burman was his classmate.

He started learning tabla at the age of four, but later took up singing under the guidance of N.C. Chakravorty, Hidan Banarjee and Gyan Prakash Ghosh. He was inspired by Bade Ghulam Ali Khan. After moving permanently to Mumbai, Khan became a disciple of Kirana gharana vocalist Padmashree Faiyaz Ahmed Khan.

Personal life
Khan is married to classical vocalist, Begum Parveen Sultana. They have a daughter.

References

Hindustani singers
1945 births
Living people
Singers from Kolkata
Indian Muslims
Place of birth missing (living people)
20th-century Indian male classical singers